Galileo Galilei Percovich Lopes (born 20 April 1968), known professionally as Leo Percovich, is a Uruguayan former professional footballer, who is currently Head of Player Pathway and Development at Championship club Middlesbrough.

Playing career
Percovich played for Nacional, notably winning the 
Copa Libertadores and Uruguayan First Division. He went on to play for Atlético Mineiro, Guaraní FC, Fluminense FC and Alianza Lima.

He appeared six times for the Uruguay national team.

Coaching career
Percovich has had previous coaching stints and training with Stuttgart, Pachuca, Cruzeiro, Valencia and Real Madrid, alongside spells serving with the national teams of Brazil, France and Uruguay.

He joined the Colorado Rapids coaching staff in 2006, as their new goalkeeper coach, serving for two seasons before joining Chivas USA prior to the commence of the 2008 season. He moved to Toronto in December 2009, as an assistant coach following the departure of Preki during the off-season. In January 2011, Percovich continued coaching in the United States, joining Chicago Fire as assistant coach. In November 2013, it was announced he would not be returning for the 2014 season. 

In November 2013, Percovich was appointed as a member of Aitor Karanka's coaching staff at Championship club Middlesbrough, being appointed as their new goalkeeping coach. He was part of the club staff that secured promotion to the Premier League at the end of the 2015–16 season. Percovich continued on as goalkeeping coach for the entirety of the 2016–17 season, despite Karanka's dismissal in March. Following the appointment of Garry Monk in June 2017, Percovich vacated his position, being replaced by Darryl Flahavan.

After a brief spell coaching at Fluminense, Percovich returned to Middlesbrough in June 2019, after being appointed as a first team assistant coach to new manager and former associate Jonathan Woodgate.

After Chris Wilder was sacked by Middlesbrough on 3 October 2022, Percovich was named caretaker manager. Middlesbrough won his first game in charge, a 1-0 home victory, over Birmingham City. On 24 October 2022, following the appointment of Michael Carrick, Percovich assumed the role of Head of Player Pathway and Development.

Personal life
In December 2017, Percovich and his family were seriously injured after the vehicle he was driving in plummeted off a bridge. He personally suffered from "slight injuries", his youngest daughter Antonella was killed, whereas his other two children, son Pietro and daughter Valentina, were seriously injured and left in critical condition. His wife Juliana suffered from a fractured pelvis. His older daughter Valentina died a week later.

Managerial statistics

Honours
Nacional
 Copa Libertadores: 1988
 Primera División Uruguaya: 1992

Middlesbrough
 Championship promotion: 2015–16

References

Living people
1968 births
Association football goalkeepers
Uruguayan footballers
Uruguay international footballers
Uruguayan expatriates in Spain
Club Nacional de Football players
Clube Atlético Mineiro players
Guarani FC players
Fluminense FC players
Club Alianza Lima footballers
Racing de Ferrol footballers
Expatriate footballers in Brazil
Expatriate footballers in Peru
Expatriate footballers in Spain
Expatriate footballers in France
Colorado Rapids non-playing staff
Chivas USA non-playing staff
Toronto FC non-playing staff
Chicago Fire FC non-playing staff
Middlesbrough F.C. non-playing staff
Association football coaches
Uruguayan football managers
Middlesbrough F.C. managers
Expatriate football managers in England